Nesopupa ponapica  is a species of very small, air-breathing land snail, a terrestrial pulmonate gastropod mollusk in the family Vertiginidae, the whorl snails. This species is endemic to the Federated States of Micronesia.

References

Fauna of Micronesia
Vertiginidae
Gastropods described in 1900
Taxonomy articles created by Polbot